Otego is an unincorporated community in Jewell County, Kansas, United States.

History
A post office was opened in Otego in 1887, and remained in operation until it was discontinued in 1954.

Education
The community is served by Rock Hills USD 107 public school district.

References

Further reading

External links
 Jewell County maps: Current, Historic, KDOT

Unincorporated communities in Jewell County, Kansas
Unincorporated communities in Kansas